Valerie Attenbrow  is principal research scientist in the Anthropology Research Section of the Australian Museum, a position she has held since 1989.

Education and career 
Attenbrow commenced her archaeological studies in the Department of Anthropology at Sydney University where she obtained a Bachelor of Arts Honours degree in 1976, and completed her PhD in 1987. She has worked as a private consulting archaeologist and in the National Parks and Wildlife Service (New South Wales) as a cultural heritage officer.

Her research has focused on the Holocene period subsistence patterns, resource use and stone tool technology of Australian Aborigines,  particularly in south-eastern Australia. She has undertaken fieldwork in Upper Mangrove Creek near Wyong on the NSW central coast) and the Port Jackson catchment (the area around Sydney Harbour).

Attenbrow is the author of a comprehensive study of the Aboriginal prehistory of the Sydney area, which was first published in 2002 (second edition in 2010), entitled Sydney’s Aboriginal Past. Investigating the Archaeological and Historical Records. For this book, Attenbrow won the inaugural (2004) John Mulvaney Book Award from the Australian Archaeological Association (AAA).

In 2002, Attenbrow was made a Life Member of the AAA for her contributions to the association, which she first became a member of in the mid-1970s. Attenbrow was elected as a Fellow of the Australian Academy of the Humanities in 2009.

In 2011, Attenbrow's colleagues at the Australian Museum produced an edited volume of academic papers dedicated to her "because she has had a major impact in all the areas of Australian archaeology that are highlighted in the papers included"; the volume was entitled "Changing Perspectives in Australian Archaeology".

In 2019, Attenbrow was awarded the Rhys Jones Medal, the highest award offered by the Australian Archaeological Association, in recognition of her outstanding and sustained contribution to the field of archaeology in Australia.

Selected publications

Books
Attenbrow, V. (2010). Sydney's Aboriginal past: investigating the archaeological and historical records. Sydney, University of New South Wales Press.
Attenbrow, V. (2006). What's changing: population size or land-use patterns? The archaeology of Upper Mangrove Creek, Sydney Basin. Canberra, ANU E Press.
Hiscock, P. and V. Attenbrow (2005) Australia's Eastern Regional Sequence revisited: Technology and change at Capertee 3. British Archaeological Reports. International Monograph Series 1397. Oxford: Archaeopress.

Articles and chapters
Robertson, G., V. Attenbrow and P. Hiscock (2019). "Residue and use-wear analysis of non-backed retouched artefacts from Deep Creek Shelter, Sydney Basin: implications for the role of backed artefacts." Archaeology in Oceania 52(2): 1-17.
Attenbrow, V. and P. Hiscock (2015). "Dates and demography: are radiometric dates a robust proxy for long‐term prehistoric demographic change?" Archaeology in Oceania 50(S1): 30-36.
Grave, P., V. Attenbrow, L. Sutherland, R. Pogson and N. Forster (2012). "Non-destructive pXRF of mafic stone tools." Journal of Archaeological Science 39(6): 1674-1686.
Robertson, G., V. Attenbrow and P. Hiscock (2009). "Multiple uses for Australian backed artefacts." Antiquity 83(320): 296-308.
Attenbrow, V., G. Robertson and P. Hiscock (2009). "The changing abundance of backed artefacts in south-eastern Australia: a response to Holocene climate change?" Journal of Archaeological Science 36: 2765-2770.
Attenbrow, V., T. Doelman and T. Corkill (2008). "Organizing the manufacture of Bondi points at Balmoral Beach, Middle Harbour, Sydney, NSW, Australia." Archaeology in Oceania 43: 104-119.
Mooney, S., M. Webb and V. Attenbrow (2007). "A comparison of charcoal and archaeological information to address the influences on Holocene fire activity in the Sydney Basin." Australian Geographer 38(2): 177-194.
Hiscock, P. and V. Attenbrow (2005). Reduction Continuums and Tool Use. Lithics 'Down Under': Australian Perspectives on Lithic Reduction, Use and Classification. C. Clarkson and L. Lamb. Oxford, Archaeopress: 43-55.
Hiscock, P. and V. Attenbrow (2004). "A revised sequence of backed artefact production at Capertee 3, New South Wales." Archaeology in Oceania 39: 94-99.
Hiscock, P. and V. Attenbrow (2003). "Early Australian implement variation: a reduction model." Journal of Archaeological Science 30: 239-249.
Hiscock, P. and V. Attenbrow (2002). Morphological and reduction continuums in eastern Australia: measurement and implications at Capertee 3. Barriers, borders, boundaries: proceedings of the 2001 Australian Archaeological Association Annual Conference. S. Ulm, C. Westcott, J. Reid et al. Brisbane, Anthropology Museum, University of Queensland. 7: 167-174.

References

Australian archaeologists
Living people
Australian women archaeologists
Fellows of the Australian Academy of the Humanities
Year of birth missing (living people)